The 1964 All-Ireland Senior Football Championship Final was the 77th All-Ireland Final and the deciding match of the 1964 All-Ireland Senior Football Championship, an inter-county Gaelic football tournament for the top teams in Ireland.

Galway took a four-point lead in the first ten minutes, and won with the help of Cyril Dunne's nine points. It was the first of three All-Ireland football titles won by Galway in the 1960s, which made them joint "team of the decade" with Down, who also won three.

Galway's three 1960s titles came consecutively.

To say that Kerry were favourites for this final would be an understatement, and given the contrast of both counties' semi-final victories, few people saw past Kerry for the All-Ireland title. Galway's hard-fought 2-point victory over Meath could hardly compare to Kerry's 12-point demolition of Cavan, or could it. If there was a prepared script, Galway didn't read it, as they proceeded to run the favourites ragged with a wonderful display of constructive, intelligent football. Their opening salvo yielded 4 points as Kerry sought to impose their own pattern on the game. They did manage to save face and at half-time, the four point gap remained, 0-7 to 0-3 in favour of Galway. Early second-half uncertainty on Galway's part almost allowed Kerry back into the decider and if they had taken one of two early goal chances, they might just have done that. It was the wake-up call Galway needed as the flow of the game steered irresistibly into Galway's hands. Cyril punished every Kerry indiscretion with the signal of a white flag. Mick O'Connell responded with equal aplomb but when Galway's lead extended to six points, it was all over. Galway had won their first title since 1956 and their 5th overall. It was the first part of their memorable "Three In A Row".

Michael Donnellan died at this game, shortly before his son John lifted the Sam Maguire Cup.

References

External links
, a British Pathé newsreel of the game

All-Ireland Senior Football Championship Final
All-Ireland Senior Football Championship Final, 1964
All-Ireland Senior Football Championship Finals
All-Ireland Senior Football Championship Finals
Galway county football team matches
Kerry county football team matches